John de Vere may refer to:
John de Vere, 7th Earl of Oxford (1312–1360)
John de Vere, 12th Earl of Oxford (1408–1462)
John de Vere, 13th Earl of Oxford (1442–1513)
John de Vere, 14th Earl of Oxford
John de Vere, 15th Earl of Oxford
John de Vere, 16th Earl of Oxford